Since the Premier League's formation at the beginning of the 1992–93 season, a total of 33 players have scored 100 or more goals in the competition; collectively, these players are collectively referred to as the Premier League 100 Club.
During the 1995–96 season, Alan Shearer became the first player to score 100 Premier League goals, and holds the record for the fewest games taken to reach the figure, doing so in 124 appearances. Additionally, he also holds the record for most goals scored in the Premier League with 260. Harry Kane is the second-fastest to 100 goals, doing so in 141 games. At 23 years and 133 days, Michael Owen was the youngest player to reach the 100 goal milestone.

Dwight Yorke was the first non-English player to score 100 goals in the Premier League, doing so on 24 November 2000. Didier Drogba was the first African player to reach the hundred goal milestone on 10 March 2012 and Sergio Aguero was the first South American to reach a century of goals on 19 April 2016. In April 2022, Cristiano Ronaldo became the most recent player to reach 100 goals.

Six of the 33 players accomplished the feat without scoring a penalty – Sadio Mané, Peter Crouch, Emile Heskey, Les Ferdinand, Andy Cole, and Ryan Giggs. Of still active players, Son Heung-min is closest to joining the 100 Club with 99 goals, and Emmanuel Adebayor departed English football in 2016 with 97 goals while on course to pass the milestone in the 12th quickest amount of games.

Players 

Key
 Bold shows players still playing in the Premier League.
 Italics show players still playing professional football in other leagues.

See also
List of English football first tier top scorers
List of top Premier League goal scorers by season
Premier League Golden Boot
List of Premier League players with 300 or more appearances
List of footballers in England by number of league goals

Notes

References

hundred
Premier League records and statistics
Association football player non-biographical articles
England 1